The following tables show state-by-state results in the Australian Senate at the 1980 federal election. Senators total 31 coalition (27 Liberal, one coalition National, one CLP), 27 Labor, two non-coalition National, five Democrats, and one Independent. Senator terms are six years (three for territories). Senators elected at this election began their terms on 1 July 1981, except for the territorial senators who took their seats at the election.

Australia

New South Wales

Victoria

Queensland 

The Liberal and Country parties contested the previous election as a Coalition, where they obtained 51.3% of the vote. In this election, they contested the election as separate parties.

South Australia

Western Australia

Tasmania

Australian Capital Territory

Northern Territory

See also

1980 Australian federal election
Candidates of the Australian federal election, 1980
Members of the Australian Senate, 1981–1983

References

External links
Adam Carr's Election Archive

1980 elections in Australia
Senate 1980
Australian Senate elections